Acontias  richardi,  Richard's legless skink, is a species of lizard in the family Scincidae. It is endemic to South Africa.

References

Acontias
Reptiles described in 1987
Endemic reptiles of South Africa